Letendraeopsis is a genus in the Tubeufiaceae family of fungi. This is a monotypic genus, containing the single species Letendraeopsis palmarum.

References

External links
Letendraeopsis at Index Fungorum

Tubeufiaceae
Monotypic Dothideomycetes genera